Summary of all-time NHL regular season results by franchise through the 2018-19 season.

 Notes

 Overtime Loss will be added to the loss column, point for OTL will be included in point total
 Active Teams in Bold

Footnotes

References

National Hockey League statistical records